Courtney Love: The Real Story is a biography of rock musician Courtney Love, written by Poppy Z. Brite. The book, Brite's first full-length work of nonfiction, was published by Simon & Schuster in 1997.  Though technically unauthorized, Love actually asked Brite to write the book, according to the biographer.

References 

1997 non-fiction books
Books by Poppy Z. Brite
American biographies
Biographies about musicians
Books about rock musicians
Unauthorized biographies
Courtney Love
Simon & Schuster books